Surgeon at Arms is a 1968 novel by the British writer Richard Gordon. It is the sequel to The Facemaker about a pioneering plastic surgeon, who now faces the growing casualties of the Second World War.

References

Bibliography
 Peacock, Scott. Contemporary Authors. Cengage Gale, 2002.

1968 British novels
Novels by Richard Gordon
Sequel novels
Heinemann (publisher) books